Frederick III (17 January 1463 – 5 May 1525), also known as Frederick the Wise (German Friedrich der Weise), was Elector of Saxony from 1486 to 1525, who is mostly remembered for the worldly protection of his subject Martin Luther.

Frederick was the son of Ernest, Elector of Saxony and his wife Elisabeth, daughter of Albert III, Duke of Bavaria. He is notable as being one of the most powerful early defenders of Martin Luther. He successfully protected Luther from the Holy Roman Emperor, the Pope and other hostile figures. He was ostensibly led, not by religious conviction, but rather by his personal belief in a fair trial for any of his subjects (a privilege guaranteed by the imperial statutory law) and the rule of law. The elector had little personal contact with Luther himself. Frederick's treasurer Degenhart Pfaffinger (Pfaffinger being a German dynasty) spoke on his behalf to Luther. Pfaffinger had supported Frederick since their pilgrimage to the Holy Land together. Frederick is considered to have remained a Roman Catholic all his life, yet gradually inclining toward doctrines of the Reformation and supposedly converting on his deathbed.

Frederick III is commemorated as a Christian ruler in the Calendar of Saints of the Lutheran Church–Missouri Synod on 5 May.

Biography

Born in Torgau, he succeeded his father as elector in 1486; in 1502, he founded the University of Wittenberg, where Martin Luther and Philip Melanchthon taught.

Frederick was among the princes who pressed the need of reform upon Holy Roman Emperor Maximilian I, and in 1500, he became president of the newly formed council of regency (Reichsregiment).

His court painter from 1504 was Lucas Cranach the Elder.

Frederick was Pope Leo X's candidate for Holy Roman Emperor in 1519; the Pope had awarded him the Golden Rose of virtue on 3 September 1518 in an effort to persuade him to accept the throne. However, Frederick helped secure the election of Charles V by agreeing to support Charles and to convince his fellow electors to do the same if Charles repaid an outstanding debt to the Saxons dating to 1497.

The Elector's Dream

On or shortly before October 30, 1517, Frederic had a dream which made a deep impression upon his mind, and which foreshadowed the work of the Reformation. 

"The feast of All-Saints was at hand, and the elector, having retired to rest, lay musing how he should keep the festival, and was praying for the poor souls in purgatory, and beseeching Divine guidance for himself, his counselors, and his people. Thus engaged, he fell asleep, and dreamed that a monk, a true son of the apostle Paul, was sent to him; and that all the saints accompanied him, for the purpose of testifying that he was divinely commissioned. They asked of the elector, that the monk might be allowed to write something on the church door at Wittenberg. The monk began to write, and the characters were so large and brilliant that they could be read at a great distance; and the pen he used was so long that its extremity reached even to Rome, and wounded the ears of a lion which was crouching there, and shook the triple crown on the pope's head. All the cardinals and princes ran to support it; and, as the dreamer himself joined in the effort to support the pope's crown, he awoke in great alarm, and angry with the monk who had used his pen so awkwardly. Presently he fell asleep again, and his strange dream continued; the disturbed lion began to roar, and Rome and all the surrounding States ran to make inquiry; and the pope demanded that the monk be restrained, and demanded this especially of the elector, as the monk dwelt in his dominions.  

"Once more the elector awoke from his dream, besought God to preserve the holy father, the pope, and slept again. And still his strange dream continued, and he saw all the princes of the empire crowding to Rome, and all striving to break the mysterious pen. Yet the more they endeavored to break it, the stiffer it became; and when they asked the monk where he found it, and why it was so strong, he replied that he secured it from one of his old schoolmasters; that it belonged to a Bohemian goose [ John Huss, who proclaimed the truth a century before Luther and whose surname in the Bohemian language signifies 'goose'] a hundred years old; and that it was strong because no man could take the pith out of it. Suddenly the dreamer heard an outcry, and lo, a great number of pens had issued from the long pen of the monk!"  

The festival of All-Saints was an important day for Wittenberg. The costly relics of the church were then displayed before the people, and a full remission of sin was granted to all who visited the church and made confession. Accordingly on this day the people in great numbers flocked to Wittenberg.  

On the 31st of October, the day preceding the festival, a monk went boldly to the church, to which a crowd of worshipers was already repairing, and affixed to the door ninety-five propositions against the doctrine of indulgences. That monk was Martin Luther. He went alone; not one of his most intimate friends knew of his design. As he fastened his theses upon the door of the church, he proclaimed himself ready to defend them the next day at the university itself against all opposers. 

These propositions attracted universal attention. They were read and re-read and repeated in every direction. Great excitement was created in the university and in the whole city.  

By these theses the doctrine of indulgences was fearlessly opposed. It was shown that the power to grant the pardon of sin, and to remit its penalty, had never been committed to the pope, or to any other man. The whole scheme was a farce, an artifice to extort money by playing upon the superstitions of the people, a device of Satan to destroy the souls of all who should trust to its lying pretensions. It was also clearly shown that the gospel of Christ was the most valuable treasure of the church, and that the grace of God, therein revealed, was freely bestowed upon all who should seek it by repentance and faith.  

God was directing the labors of this fearless builder, and the work he wrought was firm and sure. He had faithfully presented the doctrine of grace, which would destroy the assumptions of the pope as a mediator, and lead the people to Christ alone as the sinner's sacrifice and intercessor. Thus was the elector's dream already beginning to be fulfilled. The pen which wrote upon the church door extended to Rome, disturbing the lion in his lair, and jostling the pope's diadem.

Protection of Luther
Frederick ensured that Martin Luther would be heard before the Diet of Worms in 1521 and secured an exemption from the Edict of Worms for Saxony.

Frederick collected many relics in his castle church; his inventory of 1518 listed 17,443 items, including a thumb from St. Anne, a twig from Moses' burning bush, hay of the holy manger, and milk from the Virgin Mary. Money was paid in order to venerate these relics and thus escape years in purgatory. A diligent and pious person who rendered appropriate devotion to each of these relics could merit 1,902,202 years worth of penance (an earthly equivalent of time otherwise spent in Purgatory, removed by indulgences). Two years later, the collection exceeded 19,000 pieces.

He protected Luther from the Pope's enforcement of the edict by faking a highway attack on Luther's way back to Wittenberg, abducting and then hiding him at Wartburg Castle after the Diet of Worms.

Frederick died unmarried at Lochau, a hunting castle near Annaburg (30 km southeast of Wittenberg), in 1525 and was buried in the Schlosskirche at Wittenberg with a grave by Peter Vischer the Younger. He was succeeded by his brother Duke John the Steadfast as Elector of Saxony.

Issue of conversion in 1525
Frederick III was a lifelong Roman Catholic, but he might have converted to Lutheranism on his deathbed in 1525 depending on how his receiving of a Protestant communion is viewed. He leaned heavily towards Lutheranism throughout his later years, guaranteeing safety for his subject and Protestant reformer Martin Luther when he was tried for heresy and excommunicated by the Pope.

Frederick III took communion as outlined in Lutheranism on his deathbed. That can be seen as a conversion to Lutheranism, although he never officially or clearly indicated that he converted. By the time of his death, he was proclaimed to have "converted to the evangelical faith" and Saxony was now "evangelical". He protected Martin Luther and allowed Lutheranism to flourish in his realm, protecting him from the Holy Roman Emperor.  

His successor, John, Elector of Saxony, had been Lutheran even before he became elector. John made the Lutheran church the official state church in Saxony in 1527.

Ancestry

See also
Portrait of Frederick III of Saxony
Luther (2003 film)

References

Sources

 

1463 births
1525 deaths
People from Torgau
Prince-electors of Saxony
House of Wettin
People celebrated in the Lutheran liturgical calendar
Medieval child monarchs
Burials at All Saints' Church, Wittenberg
16th-century German people
Saxon princes
Imperial vicars
Medieval Knights of the Holy Sepulchre